Quincy Municipal Airport  is a city-owned, public-use airport located two nautical miles (4 km) southeast of the central business district of Quincy, a city in Grant County, Washington, United States.

Facilities and aircraft 
Quincy Municipal Airport covers an area of 38 acres (15 ha) at an elevation of 1,271 feet (387 m) above mean sea level. It has one runway designated 9/27 with an asphalt surface measuring 3,660 by 50 feet (1,116 x 15 m).

For the 12-month period ending June 28, 2010, the airport had 3,800 general aviation aircraft operations, an average of 10 per day. At that time there were six single-engine aircraft based at this airport.

References

External links 
 Quincy Municipal (80T) at WSDOT Airport Directory
 Aerial image as of July 1996 from USGS The National Map

Airports in Washington (state)
Transportation buildings and structures in Grant County, Washington